"Judgment Night" is episode 10 of the American television anthology series The Twilight Zone. In this episode, a passenger aboard a British cargo liner has no memory of how he came aboard, and is tormented by unexpected clues to his true identity and a sense that the ship is headed toward impending doom.

Plot
Carl Lanser is a passenger on the S.S. Queen of Glasgow, an isolated British cargo liner crossing the Atlantic in 1942, but has no idea of how he got aboard or who he is. Sitting with the captain and several passengers, Lanser dismisses fears of the ship being hunted by a U-boat "wolfpack", saying only one U-boat would be necessary and it would not bother using a torpedo on the ship. He is unable to explain how he knows any of this and recalls only that he was born in Frankfurt, but says that he finds the ship, its crew and passengers oddly familiar. When called to the bridge by the captain he cannot provide proof of his identity. Still confused, Lanser is sent back to his cabin with a steward, where he finds a Kriegsmarine officer's cap among his possessions with his name written on the inside.

The captain is forced to stop the ship for repairs when the overworked engines break down at 12:05. Lanser becomes increasingly restless, haunted by an inescapable sense of impending doom. Convinced that everyone aboard the ship will die at 1:15, Lanser panics and runs through the passageways, attempting to raise an alarm. He finds the ship is mysteriously empty. When he finally locates some of the passengers, they silently stare at him as he implores them to abandon ship. At exactly 1:15, a searchlight illuminates the ship, and a surfaced U-boat, commanded by Captain lieutenant Carl Lanser, opens fire with its deck cannon and machine guns. The ship sinks, leaving no survivors.

Some time later, Captain Lanser is in his cabin aboard his U-boat, recording that night's kill. His second-in-command, Lt. Mueller, is deeply troubled by their not warning the people on board the ship before firing upon them, and wonders if the U-boat crew are not all damned, and will answer for their crime by reliving the act for all eternity. Granted his own private hell as the man who ordered the massacre, Lanser returns to the deck of the Queen of Glasgow as the nightmare begins again.

Production
In the first 18 episodes, Serling only had one minor conflict with CBS regarding episode content.  In an interview with Mike Wallace on September 22, 1959, Serling said, "We changed, in eighteen scripts, Mike, we have had one line changed, which, again, was a little ludicrous but of insufficient basic concern within the context of the story, not to put up a fight. On a bridge of a British ship, a sailor calls down to the galley and asks in my script for a pot of tea, because I believe that it's constitutionally acceptable in the British Navy to drink tea. One of my sponsors happens to sell instant coffee (Sanka), and he took great umbrage, or at least minor umbrage anyway, with the idea of saying tea. Well, we had a couple of swings back and forth, nothing serious, and we decided we'd ask for a tray to be sent up to the bridge. But in eighteen scripts, that's the only conflict we've had."

Short story adaptation
The episode was adapted into a short story in the 1963 collection Rod Serling's Twilight Zone. The short story reveals how Lanser died, showing that his U-boat was sunk by a British destroyer after a crewman on the Queen of Glasgow radioed for assistance. It also adds a final scene, set 20 years after the episode, in which Barbara Stanley (revealed to have survived the sinking of the Queen of Glasgow by boarding a lifeboat) sees the ghosts of Karl Lanser and Lt. Mueller. Mueller does not share in Lanser's punishment but is doomed to witness it over and over for eternity.

See also
 "White Bear" – a Black Mirror episode with a similar plot and surprise ending

References
Zicree, Marc Scott: The Twilight Zone Companion.  Sillman-James Press, 1982  (second edition)
DeVoe, Bill. (2008). Trivia from The Twilight Zone. Albany, GA: Bear Manor Media. 
Grams, Martin. (2008). The Twilight Zone: Unlocking the Door to a Television Classic. Churchville, MD: OTR Publishing. 
Broadcasting (1960) Broadcasting Publications pg 42

External links
 

1959 American television episodes
The Twilight Zone (1959 TV series season 1) episodes
U-boat fiction
Television episodes written by Rod Serling
Fiction set in 1942
Television episodes about the afterlife
Television episodes about death